John Michael Doherty (born August 22, 1951 in Woburn, Massachusetts) is a former reserve first baseman/designated hitter in Major League Baseball who played for the California Angels between  and .

Doherty attended Reading Memorial High School in Reading, MA. He was selected by the California Angels in the 1st round (7th overall) of the 1970 MLB January Draft-Secondary Phase.

In parts of two seasons, Doherty was a .240 hitter (76-for-137) with four home runs and 27 RBI in 104 games, including 27 runs, 17 doubles, one triple, and three stolen bases.

Sources
Baseball Reference
The Baseball Cube
Retrosheet

1951 births
Living people
Baseball players from Massachusetts
California Angels players
El Paso Sun Kings players
Evansville Triplets players
Hawaii Islanders players
Major League Baseball first basemen
Major League Baseball designated hitters
Pawtucket Red Sox players
People from Woburn, Massachusetts
Quad Cities Angels players
Salt Lake City Angels players
Salt Lake City Gulls players
Shreveport Captains players
Sportspeople from Middlesex County, Massachusetts